WQQW may refer to:
 570 WWRC, Bethesda, Maryland, which used the call sign WQQW from 1946 to 1951
 1590 WQQW (Connecticut), Waterbury, Connecticut, which used the call sign from 1972 to its deletion in 1996
 1510 WQQW (Illinois), Highland, Illinois, which used the call sign from 2009 to its deletion in 2020